Paul Grant Rogers (June 4, 1921 – October 13, 2008) was an American lawyer and politician from the U.S. state of Florida. A Democrat, Rogers served in the U.S. House of Representatives as the member from Florida's 11th congressional district. He was chairman of Research America from 1996 to 2005.

Biography

Early life and education 
Rogers was born in Ocilla, Georgia, on June 4, 1921. He attended the University of Florida, where he was President of Florida Blue Key and graduated with a Bachelor of Arts degree in 1942. After graduating he joined the U.S. Army, serving in World War II from 1942 to 1946 during which he rose to the rank of Major and received a Bronze Star Medal. Rogers attended The George Washington University Law School but did not graduate there, receiving his law degree instead at the University of Florida College of Law in 1948. Rogers worked as a lawyer in private practice and was a member of the board of directors for Merck & Co. and Mutual Life Insurance Co. of New York.

Political career
He was elected as a Democrat to the 84th Congress in a special election to fill the vacancy caused by the death of his father, Dwight L. Rogers. Rogers served for and was reelected to the eleven succeeding congresses, for 24 years from January 11, 1955, to January 3, 1979. He chose not to run for reelection to the 96th Congress. While a member of the House, Rogers served as chair of the Subcommittee on Health and the Environment from 1971 to 1979. Nicknamed "Mr. Health," he was a key representative behind the adoption of the National Cancer Act of 1971, the Medical Device Amendments of 1976, the Health Maintenance Organization Act, the Emergency Medical Service Act, the Medicare-Medicaid Anti-Fraud and Abuse Amendments of 1977 and the Clean Air Act of 1970.

He was a signatory to the 1956 Southern Manifesto that opposed the desegregation of public schools ordered by the Supreme Court in Brown v. Board of Education. Rogers voted against the Civil Rights Acts of 1957, 1960, 1964, and 1968, but voted in favor of the Voting Rights Act of 1965.

Later career
Rogers was a resident of West Palm Beach, Florida and a partner in the Washington, D.C. office of Hogan & Hartson. He was also active in the National Osteoporosis Foundation, Friends of the National Library of Medicine, and the National Leadership Coalition on Health Care (now the National Coalition on Health Care).

Mark Foley has said that a meeting with Rogers when Foley was three years old inspired him to go into politics. After suffering from lung cancer and undergoing an operation, Rogers died of the disease in Washington D.C. on October 13, 2008, at a rehabilitation hospital.

Awards and honors

 Public Welfare Medal from the National Academy of Sciences (1982).
 National Health Lawyers Association Health Policy Award (1991)
 Albert Lasker Public Service Award (1993)
 American Pharmaceutical Association Hugo H, Schaefer Award (1994)
 AlliedSignal Achievement Award in Aging (1994)
 Distinguished Leadership Award from the University of Florida Health Sciences Center (1994)
 National Osteoporosis Foundation Leadership Award  (1995)
 Maxwell Finland Award for Scientific Achievement (1996)
 National Cancer Institute "Year 2000" Award
 Edwin C. Whitehead Award for Medical Research Advocacy from Research!America. (2005)

In June 2001, by an act of Congress, the main plaza at the National Institutes of Health was named in his honor. Recently, Research!America established the Paul G. Rogers Society for Global Health Research, which honors Rogers' dedication to the health care policy and advocacy.

References

External links
Rogers's Biographical Directory of the United States Congress entry
Friends of the National Library of Medicine where Paul G. Rogers is Chairman of the Board of Directors

1921 births
2008 deaths
People from Ocilla, Georgia
American segregationists
Methodists from Florida
Burials at Arlington National Cemetery
Deaths from cancer in Washington, D.C.
Deaths from lung cancer
People from West Palm Beach, Florida
University of Florida alumni
United States Army officers
Democratic Party members of the United States House of Representatives from Florida
George Washington University Law School alumni
20th-century American politicians
Fredric G. Levin College of Law alumni
United States Army personnel of World War II